The Bronze Wolf Award is bestowed by the World Scout Committee (WSC) to acknowledge "outstanding service by an individual to the World Scout Movement". It is the highest honor that can be given a volunteer Scout leader in the world and it is the only award given by the WSC. Since the award's creation in 1935, fewer than 400 of the several millions of Scouts throughout the world have received the award.

History 

Scouting's founder, Robert Baden-Powell, initially recognized outstanding contributions to Scouting by any Scout with the bestowal of the Silver Wolf; although he was Chief Scout of the World, the Silver Wolf was associated with British Scouting.

In 1924, the International Committee, predecessor of the WSC, determined that it needed an award to be given out in its own name and at its own recommendation. Baden-Powell wanted to limit the number of awards, but recognized that the concerns of the committee were valid. Conversation about the matter was re-opened in 1932, with a decision reached in June 1934. The WSC approved use of the award in Stockholm on 2 August 1935 and unanimously awarded the first Bronze Wolf to Baden-Powell.

Qualifications 

The Bronze Wolf Award is the highest honor that is given to a volunteer Scout leader throughout the world. It is given in recognition to Scouters who have contributed exceptional, noteworthy, and extraordinary service to the World Scout Movement. It recognizes the individual's contributions, service, dedication, and many years of volunteer work in successfully implementing the Scouting program. It is only "given to people that have provided a lifetime of selfless and voluntary service to the upliftment and service of youth and country."

Recipients 

In order to keep the award a notable honor, the International Committee limited the number of awards within a two-year period to two; however, in practice, it was given even more rarely, with only 12 awards being bestowed between 1935 and 1955. As Scouting's numbers have increased, so have the number of awards bestowed. Between 1955 and 2015, the award was bestowed 346 times. The guidelines of the WSC dictate that the number of awards granted should be limited to "approximately one award for each 2,000,000 members worldwide". , the World Scout Bureau estimates there are about 28 million Scouts worldwide. Eight Bronze Wolf Awards were given in 2017.

Among the recipients have been heads of state such as Hamengkubuwono IX, Vice President of Indonesia, Carl XVI Gustaf of Sweden, Jean, Grand Duke of Luxembourg, Bhumibol Adulyadej and Philippine president Fidel Ramos.

Description
The Bronze Wolf award consists of a dark green ribbon bordered by two narrow stripes of yellow from which descends a bronze pendant of a wolf, statant. The wolf bears the World Scout Emblem.

References

Awards established in 1935
Scout and Guide awards